Boreča is a village in the Municipality of Gornji Petrovci in the Prekmurje region of Slovenia. Unlike the surrounding area, the village is relatively nucleated and surrounded by a pine forest. The local church is built southeast of the village and is a Late Gothic building dating to 1521. It has a relatively high nave with a narrower polygonal sanctuary. In 1739 its interior was refurbished in the Baroque style. It is dedicated to Saint Anne and belongs to the Murska Sobota Diocese. There is a Catholic cemetery next to the church. The Lutheran cemetery lies beyond it. There is also a wooden Lutheran belfry in the village.

Notable people
Notable people that were born or lived in Boreča include:
József Ficzkó (a.k.a. Jožef Ficko) (1772–1843), Burgenland Croatian writer

References

External links 
Boreča on Geopedia

Populated places in the Municipality of Gornji Petrovci